Timezrit is a town in northern Algeria. It is located in Kabylia. Also known as At Yemmel in the past, it was the main town of the Beni Immel.

Communes of Béjaïa Province